Cicindela decemnotata, the badlands tiger beetle, is a species of flashy tiger beetle in the family Carabidae. It is found in North America.

Subspecies
These five subspecies belong to the species Cicindela decemnotata:
 Cicindela decemnotata albertina Casey
 Cicindela decemnotata bonnevillensis Knisley & Kippenhan, 2012
 Cicindela decemnotata decemnotata Say, 1817 (badlands tiger beetle)
 Cicindela decemnotata meriwetheri Knisley & Kippenhan, 2012
 Cicindela decemnotata montevolans Knisley & Kippenhan, 2012

References

Further reading

 
 

decemnotata
Articles created by Qbugbot
Beetles described in 1817